Hollis Steeves (born March 5, 1935) is a farmer and former political figure in New Brunswick, Canada. He represented Petitcodiac in the Legislative Assembly of New Brunswick from 1987 to 1991 and from 1995 to 1999 as a Liberal member.

Early life
He was born in Moncton, New Brunswick, the son of Stanley and Thelma Steeves, and educated at the Ontario Police College.

Career
Steeves was a police officer in Ontario for several years. He returned to New Brunswick, where he became a cattle farmer, also raising horses. Steeves ran unsuccessfully for a seat in the provincial assembly in 1982. He retired from politics in 1999.

Family life
He was married to Ilse Klingenhoff.

References 
 Canadian Parliamentary Guide, 1997, Kathryn O'Handley 

1935 births
Living people
New Brunswick Liberal Association MLAs
People from Moncton